Hugo Alfaro (Tala, Uruguay, 20 February 1917 – Montevideo, 16 March 1996) was a Uruguayan journalist, intellectual and film critic.
In his youth he contributed to the famous weekly newspaper Marcha. Later, in 1985, he was the main founder of the newspaper Brecha.

Works
 Mi mundo tal cual es (Ed. Marcha. 1966)
 Ver para creer
 Reportajes a la realidad
 Navegar es necesario. Quijano y el semanario Marcha (Ediciones de la Banda Oriental. 1984)
 Mario Benedetti: detrás de un vidrio claro (Trilce. 1986)
 Pruebas de imprenta
 Por la vereda del sol (Ed. de Brecha. 1994)

References

External links
 

1917 births
1996 deaths
People from Canelones Department
Uruguayan male writers
Uruguayan journalists
Uruguayan film critics
20th-century journalists
Uruguayan autobiographers